Donald Holst "Don" Clausen (April 27, 1923 – February 7, 2015) was an American businessman, World War II veteran, and politician who served ten terms as a U.S. Representative from California from 1963 to 1983.

Biography
Born in Ferndale, California, Clausen graduated from elementary and high schools of Ferndale, where he was an honors student and lettered five sports: tennis, track, basketball, football and baseball as well as being the drum major of the school band.

He attended San José State University, California Polytechnic State University (in San Luis Obispo, California), Weber State University (in Ogden, Utah), and Saint Mary's College of California. He took part in the U.S. Navy V5 Aviation Cadet Program.  He served as a carrier pilot in the Asiatic-Pacific Theater of the Second World War from 1944 to 1945, flying F4U Corsair aircraft. Post-war, Clausen helped found the Del Norte County Airport, and served as a member of the board of supervisors of Del Norte County, California, from 1955 to 1962.  He ran two companies in Crescent City, his insurance business, Clausen Associates, and Clausen Flying Service, an air ambulance service, and it was from Crescent City that he served Congress.

Clausen was elected as a Republican to the Eighty-eighth Congress to fill the vacancy caused by the death of United States Representative Clement Woodnutt Miller (who had been re-elected posthumously), and to the nine succeeding Congresses (January 22, 1963 – January 3, 1983).

Clausen authored the bill creating the Lady Bird Johnson Grove in the Redwood National Park.  Former president Lyndon Johnson and Lady Bird Johnson, sitting president Richard Nixon, and future president Ronald Reagan and many other federal and local dignitaries attended the dedication of the grove.   Clausen said that this was his proudest accomplishment.

He was an unsuccessful candidate for reelection to the Ninety-eighth Congress in 1982, narrowly losing to Democrat Douglas H. Bosco. He served as director, special programs, Federal Aviation Administration from 1983 to 1990 and was a resident of Santa Rosa, California, after his Congressional tenure ended.

The Don Clausen Fish Hatchery in Sonoma County was named in his honor and the Redwood National Park Bypass on US Highway 101 was renamed the Don Clausen Highway in 1996 by act of the California Legislature due to his efforts at obtaining appropriations for building that road and the Redwood National Park Visitor Center.

Clausen died in a hospital on February 7, 2015, in Fortuna, California, from complications of diabetes, chronic obstructive pulmonary disease (COPD), and heart and lung disease. His congressional papers are archived at Humboldt State University library.

References

1923 births
2015 deaths
Federal Aviation Administration personnel
California Polytechnic State University alumni
San Jose State University alumni
Weber State University alumni
Saint Mary's College of California alumni
County supervisors in California
People from Ferndale, California
Businesspeople from California
United States Navy pilots of World War II
Republican Party members of the United States House of Representatives from California
20th-century American politicians
People from Santa Rosa, California
20th-century American businesspeople
Military personnel from California